Miner's Glory is an honorary badge introduced in the Soviet Union in 1956 and continued in Russia. It is an award for the labour achievements of the workers in the mining industry  and in some cases, for supporting work (new technologies, fight with disasters, work in adjacent industries, etc.)

It is issued in three degrees: the 1st degree, 2nd degree and the 3rd degree.   

It is made of tombac (red brass), gold, with no resin (томпак, золото, без смолы).

Civil awards and decorations of the Soviet Union
Civil awards and decorations of Russia
Mining in the Soviet Union